Speaker of the House of Assembly of Saint Vincent and the Grenadines is elected by the majority party in the House of Assembly in consultation with the Opposition, when the House first meets after a General Election.

Speakers of the House of Assembly

Below is the list of office-holders:

Footnotes and references

Politics of Saint Vincent and the Grenadines
Saint Vincent and the Grenadines
Speakers of the House